Diastata adusta is a species of fly in the family Diastatidae. It is found in the  Palearctic .

Range
Belgium, Bulgaria, Czech Republic, Denmark, Finland, France, Germany, Great Britain, Hungary, Ireland, Italy, Netherlands, Slovakia, Spain & Sweden.

References

External links
Images representing Diastata at BOLD

Diastatidae
Insects described in 1830
Muscomorph flies of Europe